José Alejandro Lora Serna (born December 2, 1952 in Puebla, México), better known by his stage name Álex Lora, is a Mexican musician and composer. He has been the frontman of the Mexican rock band El Tri for over 50 years, since October 12 of 1968 when he founded among Carlos Hauptvogel and Guillermo Berea the Three souls in my mind band, but because of differences with Carlos, Alex decided to create a new band called El Tri, as the followers of Three souls in my mind used to call them. In 2006, Hispanic music website batanga.com characterized Lora as "legendary", noting that among his honors and awards he has been named a "Distinguished Pueblan Citizen" in his home city and has been given the keys to the city in Miami, as well as having a day (November 10, 2002) and a statue in his hometown Tequela,Nayarit.

Discography

 Lora, Su Lira y Sus Rolas (1998),
 Alex Lora: Esclavo del Rocanrol (2003)

Filmography
 2003: Alex Lora: Esclavo del Rocanrol (documentary) 
 2008: The Dead Sleep Easy 
 2009:"Nikté" (animated) as Chamán Chanek

See also

 Statue of Álex Lora

References

External links
MSN Music: Alex Lora

 Alex Lora: Esclavo del rocanrol (documentary)

1952 births
Ariel Award winners
Living people
Mexican male singer-songwriters
Mexican singer-songwriters
Mexican male composers
Mexican guitarists
Mexican people of Spanish descent
Mexican male guitarists
People from Puebla (city)
Latin Grammy Lifetime Achievement Award winners
Latin music songwriters